The GTA MyCar (styled MyCar) is an electric vehicle originally produced by EuAuto Technology Limited based in Hong Kong, and from 2010 by GreenTech Automotive when it acquired EuAuto. The company had its manufacturing facility in Dongguan, China. The MyCar is classified as a NEV in the United States due to its low top speed. Manufacturing ended in 2017 and the company folded in 2018.

History
The car was first conceived by Giorgetto Giugiaro of Italdesign in 2003. The propulsion system was engineered in co-operation with Hong Kong Polytechnic University.

In 2010, GreenTech Automotive, Inc. bought EuAuto Technology, Ltd., and announced plans to manufacture and market vehicles in the United States.

The first U.S. manufactured MyCar vehicles, which were also supposed be exported to Denmark, were supposed to come off the assembly line in Horn Lake, Mississippi, on 4 July 2011. As of August 2013, GreenTech Automotive had not disclosed any sales figures, but was promising production of 30,000 vehicles annually in 2014. Subsequently, the company broke ground on a new plant in Tunica, Mississippi, at the start of 2014.

Specification

Performance:

 Maximum Gradient: More than 20% at GVW
 Consumption Approx.: 196 Wh/mile

Weights and Dimensions:
 Body and Finish: Painted Fiberglass Reinforced Plastic (FRP) Body Panels
 Steering: Rack-and-Pinion, Adjustable Steering Wheel
 Turning Radius: 3.75 m
 Rear Luggage Compartment: 86 litres
 Unladen Weight: 710 kg (without a driver, with batteries)
 Maximum Safe Load: 200 kg
 Total Authorized Laden Weight: 910 kg
 Track: Front: 1,173 mm – Rear: 1,227

Technical Specifications:

Batteries:
 Type: Lead AGM, maintenance free
 Number of Batteries in pack: 4
 Pack Tension: 48V
 Pack Capacity: 200 Ah
 Power Onboard: 9.6kWh

Onboard Battery Charger:
 Domestic Electric Supply: 190 – 255V AC, 16A
 Charging Power: 2100 W
 Recharge Time: 8 – 10 hours (quick charge: 3 hours)
 Charger: 48V DC
 Battery Self Discharge: 0.83% per week at 20oC

Motorization:
 Motor Type: 48V DC Electric Motor with Separate Excitation
 Maximum Power: 5 kW
 Transmission: Electronic Controlled Single Speed Automatic with differential (forward, reverse, neutral)
 Motor and Batteries Location: Middle of Vehicle
 Tyres and Wheels: 14" Aluminum Alloy Wheels (165 / 60 R14)
 Auxiliary Equipment: Powered by a 12V 18Ah Lead AGM battery re-charged by a DC/DC Converter

Speed Control: Electronic Controller with Regenerative Brake to increase drive range

Chassis: Steel Tubular Space Frame with Roof Frame

Suspension:
 Type: Independent on All Wheels
 Front: McPherson Type with Coil Springs and Dampers
 Rear: Trailing Arm Type with Coil Springs and Dampers

Braking System:
 Type of braking: Dual Circuit Hydraulic Braking System
 Front: 209 mm diameter brake discs
 Rear: 209 mm diameter brake discs
 Parking Brakes: Mechanical on Rear Axle

Design
The Giorgetto Giugiaro designed MyCar is a 2-door, 2-seater coupe measuring 2.6 m long, 1.4 m wide and 1.4 m high. The car can accommodate occupants up to 6"5, with a boot front and rear, giving a combined space of 140 litres. The maximum payload is 200 kg.

The car comes in two versions: Standard and Select. Identical in drivetrain, the Select adds leather seats, panoramic glass roof, parking sensors, upgraded radio, larger alloy wheels and body coloured steering mirrors.

Sales
The UK was the first market to sell the MyCar, through EV Stores in 2009. France followed soon after, with Monaco-based Newteon handling distribution. Late in 2009 Meco World was announced as the distributor for Austria. EU Auto announced in October that the car had been approved for use in Hong Kong and that sales were to begin in the home market of the car.

Production of the MyCar in the United States was scheduled to begin in the first part of 2011.  The base price for the first 100,000 units was announced as $10,000 US. By 2014, the MyCar was still not on sale in the US market and a list price of US$15,500 was being discussed.

References

External links 

MyCar Hong Kong official site

Production electric cars
Hong Kong brands
Hong Kong Polytechnic University